Abdul-Ilah al-Bashir al-Noeimi is the former Chief of Staff of the Supreme Military Council (SMC) of the Free Syrian Army. He was succeeded by Albay Ahmed Berri in October 2014.

Background
Noeimi comes from a large Arab tribe called the al-Noeim. The tribe is spread across the Middle East, and is prominent in the villages of the Golan Heights and the Quneitra countryside. Prior to the Syrian Civil War, Noeimi served as a career officer in the Syrian Army where he was Brigadier General.

Syrian Civil War
Noeimi defected from the Syrian Army on 13 July 2012, alongside several other officers from the Noeimi tribe, including Saleh Al-Hammada Al-Noeimi, and Hashem Al-Bashir Al-Noeimi. He was later appointed Chief of the FSA Military Council in Quneitra.

Noeimi has called for support from the European Union and the United States, either through the supply of weapons, or through direct military intervention. Noeimi has also met with Iranian opposition groups such as the MEK, and has expressed his support for the overthrow of the Iranian government and the velayat-e faqih style of governance.

His son, Talal, was killed during clashes with the Syrian Army in the Quneitra countryside, on 26 November 2013.

Noeimi was appointed to the position of Chief of Staff on 16 February 2014, taking over from Salim Idris. His appointment was confirmed by the FSA on 8 March 2014. Colonel Heitham Afeisi, a co-founder of the Syria Revolutionaries Front and the Commander of the Maarat al-Naaman Martyrs Brigade, was appointed as Noeimi's deputy.

The United States has sidelined Noeimi's office, and American officials have called his title a "business card".

References

Living people
Syrian generals
Defectors to the Free Syrian Army
Year of birth missing (living people)